Adolph Ferdinand Gehlen (5 September 1775 – 16 July 1815) was a German chemist.

Life and education 
Gehlen was born in Bütow, Farther Pomerania (now Bytów, Poland), he is known as the publisher of Neues allgemeines Journal der Chemie (1803–1806), Journal für Chemie und Physik (1806-10) and the Repetitorium für die Pharmacie (first series; later continued by Johann Andreas Buchner).

He studied at the University of Königsberg and obtained his residency in 1806 from the University of Halle, where he worked as a chemist in the clinical institute of Johann Christian Reil. From 1807 to 1815 he served as an academic chemist at the Bavarian Academy of Sciences. He died from arsenic poisoning in Munich on 16 July 1815, age 39.

References

Sources
 Gehlen, Adolf Ferdinand
 
 

18th-century German chemists
German publishers (people)
1775 births
1815 deaths
People from Bytów County
People from the Province of Pomerania
19th-century German chemists